Nanoreactors are a form of chemical reactor that are particularly in the disciplines of nanotechnology and nanobiotechnology. These special reactors are crucial in maintaining a working nanofoundry; which is essentially a foundry that manufactures products on a nanotechnological scale.

Summary

General information
Researchers in the Netherlands have succeeded in building nanoreactors that can perform one-pot multistep reactions - the next step towards artificial cell-like devices in addition for applications involving the screening and diagnosis of a disease or illness. A biochemical nanoreactor is created simply by unwrapping a biological virus through scientific methods, eliminating its harmful contents, and re-assembling its protein coat around a single molecule of enzyme. The kinetic isotope effect is trapped in a single molecule within a membrane-based nanoreactor. This is a phenomenon that has been found by researchers in the United Kingdom during experiments done in September 2010. The kinetic isotope effect, where the rate of a reaction is influenced by the presence of an  isotopic atom in solution, is an important principle for elucidating reaction mechanisms. This recent finding could open up new methods to study chemical reactions. They may even aid in the process of creating new (and even more powerful) nanoreactors.

Using nanocrystals, a scalable and inexpensive process can ultimately create nanoreactors. Researchers at the Lawrence Berkeley National Laboratory in Berkeley have the ability to take advantage of the large difference in select components to create these nanocrystals and nanoreactors. Nanocrystals are easier to use and less expensive than methods that employ sacrificial templates in the creation process of hollow particles. Catalyst particles are separated into shells in order to prevent particle aggregation. Selective entry into the catalysis chamber reduces the likelihood of desired products undergoing secondary reactions.

Nanoreactors can also be built by controlling the positioning of two different enzymes in the central water reservoir or the plastic membrane of synthetic nanoscopic bubbles. Once the third enzyme is added into the surrounding solution, it becomes possible for three different enzymatic reactions to occur at once without interfering with each other (resulting in a "one-pot" reaction). The potential for nanoreactors can be demonstrated by binding the enzyme horseradish peroxidase into the membrane itself; trapping the enzyme glucose oxidase. The surrounding solution would end up containing the enzyme lipase B with the glucose molecules containing four acetyl groups as the substrate. The resulting glucose would cross the membrane, become oxidized, and the horseradish peroxidase would convert the sample substrate ABTS (2,2’-azinobis(3-ethylbenzthiazoline-6-sulfonic acid)) into its radical cation.

Abilities
Nanoreactors can also be used to emulsify water, create hydrofuels (which essentially blends 15% water into the refined diesel product), play a helpful role in the chemical industry by allowing multiple streams of raw materials to exists in a single nanoreactor, manufacture personal care products (i.e., lotions, pharmaceutical creams, shampoos, conditioners, shower gels, deodorants), and improve the food and beverage industries (by processing sauces, purées, cooking bases for soup, emulsifying non-alcoholic beverages, and salad dressings).

Personal care goods can be enhanced by companies feeding multiple phases of material, using a mixing device with water, and creating instant emulsions. These emulsions would come with smaller particles, are expected to have a longer shelf life and an give off an enhanced appearance when sold at retailers. The needs of the food and beverage industry can result in lower processing costs, more space, better efficiency, and lower equipment costs. This may bring down the cost of food and beverages for consumers; even alcoholic beverages that are subject to hidden sin taxes.

Hydrofuel can be used to move heavy duty transports, trains, earth-moving equipment (including bulldozers), in addition to providing fuel to most boats and ships. Reduced pollution and increased fuel efficiency may come out of nanoreactor-produced hydrofuel. The increased usage of renewable energy may also help to improve the world's environment thanks to nanoreactors.

References

Nanotechnology